Whanganui Collegiate School (formerly Wanganui Collegiate School; see here) is a state-integrated, coeducational, day and boarding, secondary school in Whanganui, Manawatū-Whanganui region, New Zealand. The school is affiliated to the Anglican church.

About 
Whanganui Collegiate School was founded as Wanganui Collegiate School in 1854 thanks to a land grant in 1852 by the Governor of New Zealand, Sir George Grey, to the Bishop of New Zealand, George Augustus Selwyn, for the purpose of establishing a school. The school moved to its current site in 1911. It was originally a boys-only school but in 1991 began admitting girls at senior levels and went fully co-educational in 1999. The school celebrated its 150th anniversary in 2004.

St George’s School moved to the Collegiate campus in 2010. The combined schools provide primary education for day students on the St George’s campus, and secondary education for day and boarding students on the Collegiate campus.

Collegiate is an International Member of The Headmasters' and Headmistresses' Conference (HMC) which represents heads of the leading independent schools in Ireland, the United Kingdom and international schools mainly from the Commonwealth. Whanganui Collegiate is one of only three member schools in New Zealand.

Since 2019, Collegiate has been one of three Round Square schools in New Zealand along with King's College and Christ's College.

Prince Edward, Duke of Edinburgh, spent two terms in 1982 at the school as a junior master during his gap year.

In November 2012, it was announced that the school would integrate into the state system effective January 2013, after requiring a $3.8 million bailout from the government to stay afloat.

In January 2019, the Whanganui Collegiate School Board of Trustees and Whanganui College Board of Trustees unanimously voted to add an 'h' to the spelling of 'Wanganui', following other local organisations and secondary schools after the Whanganui District was similarly renamed in November 2015.

School life 
As a boarding school, the house system plays a significant role in student life. Each house (of which there are 6 in total; four for boys and two for girls) accommodates approximately 80 students, and each has its own Housemaster, Assistant Housemaster and Matron.  The school houses are named Harvey which is named after Reverend B. W. (Bache Wright) Harvey, Hadfield which is named after Octavius Hadfield, Grey which is named after George Grey, Selwyn which is named after George Selwyn, Godwin and Bishops.

The school grounds also host numerous sporting facilities, including the Izard Gymnasium, High Performance Cricket Centre, a water surface hockey turf, a full-sized Cross Country Course and many team sports fields. The nearby Whanganui River is used by students for rowing training and competitions; rowing being one of the sports in which Collegiate has traditionally excelled, having won the Maadi Cup 17 times, a national record. The Collegiate women's squad had a particularly strong year in 2006 when it won the most prestigious women's race in the lower north Island, the Levin Jubilee Trophy, for the first time. Unfortunately, such success could not be replicated on the national stage, with the u18 girls eight only managing bronze in the penultimate race of the 2007 Maadi Cup. The School also hosts the nationally popular Whanganui Cricket Festival each year which sees over 1000 cricketers display their skills throughout the month of January.

Since 1925, the school's 'First XV' rugby team has played Christ's College, Wellington College and Nelson College in an annual quadrangular rugby tournament, this Tournament is played at a different school every year playing at Collegiate once every four years.  In recent times, this tournament has been dominated by Wellington College.  Whanganui Collegiate last won in 1991.

Since 1994, The New Zealand Opera School has been hosted at Collegiate by Donald Trott.

Notable alumni 

 Brigadier Leslie Andrew, WW1 Victoria Cross & DSO recipient
 Chris Amon, Formula One racing driver, 1966 24 Hours of Le Mans champion
 Harriet Austin, rower
 Earl Bamber, professional racing driver, 2015 24 Hours of Le Mans and 2017 24 Hours of Le Mans champion
 Andrew Bayly, National Party MP
 Cameron Brewer, Auckland Councillor
 Tom Bruce, New Zealand international cricketer
 Robin Cooke, Baron Cooke of Thorndon, Law Lord
 Mark Cooper, President of New Zealand Court of Appeal
 Professor Michael Corballis, professor of psychology 
 Wyatt Creech, Deputy Prime Minister
 Simon Dickie, Olympic gold medalist in rowing
 Prince Edward, Duke of Edinburgh
 Sir Harold Gillies, father of plastic surgery
 Leon Götz, National Party MP
 Sir Richard Harrison, National Party MP and Speaker of the House
 Volker Heine, physicist
 Joline Henry, Silver Fern netballer
 Nichkhun Horvejkul, Thai-American singer and actor based in South Korea, member of South Korean boy band 2PM
 Jimmy Hunter, member of The Original All Blacks
 Sir Roy Jack, National Party MP, Speaker of the House and Cabinet Minister
 Shehan Karunatilaka, Booker Prize winner
 David Kirk, All Black World Cup winning captain and former Chief Executive of Fairfax Media
 Patrick Marshall, geologist
 Hamish McDouall, Mayor of Whanganui
 Sir John McGrath, Solicitor-General and Supreme Court Justice
 Ian McKelvie, National Party MP
 Air Vice Marshal Cuthbert MacLean, RAF Officer
 Lloyd Morrison, businessman
 Arthur Porritt, Baron Porritt, former Governor-General of New Zealand, Olympic medallist
 Sir Hugh Rennie KC, lawyer and businessman
 Earle Riddiford, lawyer and mountaineer
 John Scott, former Director-General of the Fiji Red Cross
 Rebecca Scown, Olympic gold medalist in rowing
 Ratu Sir Lala Sukuna, Fijian statesman
 Sir Brian Talboys, Deputy Prime Minister 1975–1981
 John Tanner, murderer
 Sir Ron Trotter, businessman
 Jeremy Wells, television and radio personality
 Professor David Williams, Treaty of Waitangi and legal scholar

Headmasters 
Charles Henry Sinderby Nicholls (1854–1865)
Henry H Godwin (1865–1877)
George Richard Saunders (1878–1882)
Bache Wright Harvey (1882–1887)
Walter Empson (1888–1909)
Julian Llewellyn Dove (1909–1914)
Hugh Latter (1914–1916)
Patrick Marshall (1917–1922)
Robert Guy Wilson (1922)
Charles Frederick Pierce (1922–1931)
John Allen (1932–1935)
Frank William Gilligan (1936–1954)
Rab Brougham Bruce-Lockhart (1954–1960)
Thomas Umfrey Wells (1960–1980)
Ian McKinnon (1980–1988)
Trevor Stanton McKinlay (1988–1995)
Johnathan Rae Hensman (1995–2003)
Craig Considine (2003–2008)
Tim Wilbur (2008–2013)
Chris Moller (2013–2017)
Ross Brown (2017–2017) (acting) 
Wayne Brown (2018–present)

Notes

References

External links 

 Whanganui Collegiate School official website

Educational institutions established in 1852
Secondary schools in Manawatū-Whanganui
Member schools of the Headmasters' and Headmistresses' Conference
Boarding schools in New Zealand
Schools in Whanganui
Anglican schools in New Zealand
1852 establishments in New Zealand